A croque monsieur is a hot sandwich made with ham and cheese. The name comes from the French words croque ("crunch") and monsieur ("mister").

History 
The dish originated in French cafés and bars as a quick snack. In the early 1900s, bistro owner Michel Lunarca popularized the croque-monsieur.

Preparation
A croque monsieur is traditionally made with baked or boiled ham and sliced cheese between slices of pain de mie, topped with grated cheese and slightly salted and peppered, and then baked in an oven or fried in a frying pan. The bread may optionally be browned by grilling after being dipped in beaten egg. Traditionally, Gruyère is used, but sometimes Comté or Emmental cheese as well. Some brasseries also add béchamel sauce.

Croque monsieur may be baked or fried so that the cheese topping melts and forms a crust.

Variations
A croque monsieur served with a poached or lightly fried egg on top is known as a croque madame (or, in parts of Normandy, as a croque-à-cheval). According to the Petit Robert dictionary, the name dates to around 1960. The name croque-mademoiselle is associated with its lighter, vegetarian version: made of the same bread, but with ordinary melting cheese, accompanied with chives, cucumber and lettuce.

In the United Kingdom, a ham-and-cheese hot snack is called a toastie, and toastie makers are available to buy. In the United States, the Monte Cristo, a ham-and-cheese sandwich, often dipped in egg and fried, is popular diner fare.

Variants of the sandwich with substitutions or additional ingredients are given names modelled on the original croque-monsieur, for example:

See also

 Welsh rarebit
 Ham and cheese sandwich
 Ham and egg bun
 Monte Cristo sandwich
 Francesinha
 Strammer Max
 Toastie
 List of ham dishes
 List of sandwiches

References

French sandwiches
French cuisine
Ham dishes
Cheese sandwiches
Pork sandwiches